The Bridgeport Jets were a minor league American football team based in Bridgeport, Connecticut. They began play in the Atlantic Coast Football League in 1966 as the Waterbury Orbits. The Orbits, already officially affiliated with the New York Jets of the American Football League, became the Bridgeport Jets in 1968. After relocating from Waterbury, the Jets played their homes games in John F. Kennedy Stadium.

The ACFL suspended operations for the 1972 season after losing several franchises. While the Jets did not dissolve they were inactive for the year. They returned as part of a six-team ACFL in 1973 and enjoyed their most successful season. They finished atop their division with an 11–1 record and faced the New England Colonials in the league championship game, which they lost 41–17. It turned out to be the final game for the ACFL, which folded soon after.

The Jets moved to the Seaboard Football League in 1974, and advanced to their second league title game in a row. Once again they lost, this time 20–9 to the Wilkes-Barre Bullets. Both the Jets and Bullets were the only teams in the league to complete their seasons. With the cessation of the Seaboard Football League, the Jets' franchise ended.

Season-by-season

References

Atlantic Coast Football League teams
American football teams in Connecticut
Sports in Bridgeport, Connecticut
1966 establishments in Connecticut
1974 disestablishments in Connecticut
American football teams established in 1966
Sports clubs disestablished in 1974